Breiðárlón is a glacier lake at the south end of the Icelandic glacier Vatnajökull.

The glacier calving into the lagoon is a part of Vatnajökull National Park and the better known glacier lake Jökulsárlón is not far from there. From Breiðárlón a little river flows into the Fjallsárlón.

See also
List of lakes of Iceland

Glacial lakes
Lakes of Iceland